Ndam or NDAM may refer to 
Ndam language of Chad
National Democratic Action Movement
Ndam (surname)